Mendheim may refer to:

 Brady E. Mendheim Jr. (born 1968), Associate Justice of the Supreme Court of Alabama
 Florence Mendheim (1899–1984), New York Public Library librarian notable for her undercover surveillance of American Nazi groups in the 1930s
 Julius Mendheim (ca. 1788–1836), German chess master and problemist